Tabakovići is a village in the municipalityof Novo Goražde, Republika Srpska, Bosnia and Herzegovina.

References

Populated places in Novo Goražde